The Johns Hopkins University School of Nursing (JHUSON) is the nursing school of Johns Hopkins University in Baltimore, Maryland. Established in 1889, it is one of the nation's oldest schools for nursing education. It is continuously rated as the top nursing program in the US per U.S. News & World Report.

Origins
The founder Johns Hopkins' desire for a training school for female nurses was formally stated in a posthumous 1873 instruction letter to the board of trustees of the Johns Hopkins institutions. The School of Nursing in conjunction with the Johns Hopkins Hospital was eventually founded in 1889 after in depth consultation with Florence Nightingale on its planning, organization, structure and curriculum.

Location
The Johns Hopkins University School of Nursing is located on the Johns Hopkins University East Baltimore campus along with the Bloomberg School of Public Health, School of Medicine, and the Johns Hopkins Hospital.

Academics
The School of Nursing offers a variety of programs from pre-licensure programs to Master's, DNP and PhD programs, online options, post-degree opportunities, and nursing prerequisites.

Research centers 
The school has four research centers (Center for Innovative Care in Aging, Center for Nursing Research and Sponsored Projects, Center for Collaborative Intervention Research and the Center on Health Disparities Research) and also offers Interdisciplinary Fellowship research on violence, pain, and health disparities in underserved populations, as well as research focused on cardiovascular health prevention and risk reduction, care at end of life, community-based health promotion, health disparities, interpersonal violence, maternal-child health, psychoneuroimmunology, and symptom management areas. The school is also home to the country's first and only Peace Corps Fellows Program in nursing. The school offers a special program for Arts and Science College students to transfer after two years.

Notable alumni
Vashti Bartlett, Red Cross nurse during World War I, and in Vladivostok, Manchuria, and Haiti
Alice Fitzgerald, Director of the Nursing Bureau, League of Red Cross Societies, Geneva
Elizabeth Gordon Fox, Director of the Bureau of Public Nursing, American Red Cross
Mary Adelaide Nutting (World's first professor of nursing)
Isabel Hampton Robb (Founder of modern American nursing theory and one of the most important leaders in the history of nursing, first Dean of the School)
Elizabeth Lawrie Smellie (First woman Colonel of the Canadian army and Matron-in-chief of the Canadian Army Medical Corps)
Ernestine Wiedenbach (Major nursing theorist in  maternity and clinical nursing)

References

Further reading
 James, Janet Wilson. "Isabel Hampton and the Professionalization of Nursing in the 1890s," in Morris J. Vogel and Charles E. Rosenberg, eds. Therapeutic Revolution: Essays in the Social History of American Medicine (1979) pp 201–244
 Kaufman M et al. Dictionary of American medical biography. Greenwood Press, Westport CN, vol 2. Page 640.
 Ramos, Mary Carol. "The Johns Hopkins Training School For Nurses: A Tale Of Vision, Labor, And Futility," Nursing History Review (1997), Vol. 5, pp 23–48.

External links
Official Website

School of Nursing
Johns Hopkins Medical Institutions
Johns Hopkins Hospital
Educational institutions established in 1889
Academic health science centres
Middle East, Baltimore
Nursing schools in Maryland
1889 establishments in Maryland